Mary Amelia Ingalls (January 10, 1865 – October 20, 1928) was born near the town of Pepin, Wisconsin. She was the first child of Caroline and Charles Ingalls and older sister of author Laura Ingalls Wilder, known for her Little House book series.

Biography
Mary Ingalls was born January 10, 1865.

At age 14, Ingalls suffered an illness – allegedly scarlet fever – thought at the time to cause her blindness. A 2013 medical study concluded that viral encephalitis actually stole her eyesight, based on evidence from first-hand accounts and newspaper reports of her illness, as well as relevant school registries, and epidemiologic data on blindness and infectious diseases. Between 1881 and 1889, Ingalls attended the Iowa Braille and Sight Saving School in Vinton, Iowa.

The historical record doesn't show why Ingalls did not attend school during one year of that time, but she did finish the seven-year course of study in 1889 and graduated. She then returned home to her parents in De Smet, South Dakota and contributed to the family income by making fly nets for horses.

After her father died in 1902, she and her mother rented out a room in their home for extra income. Following her mother's death in April 1924, she lived for a time with her sister, Grace Ingalls Dow in Manchester, South Dakota.

She then traveled to Keystone, South Dakota to live with her second youngest sister Carrie Ingalls Swanzey. There she suffered from a stroke, and on October 20, 1928, she died of pneumonia at age 63. Her body was returned to De Smet, where she was buried in the Ingalls family plot next to her parents at De Smet Cemetery.

In popular culture
Ingalls was portrayed in the television series Little House on the Prairie by actress Melissa Sue Anderson. The television version of Mary Ingalls became a teacher in a school for the blind and married a blind fellow teacher, Adam Kendall, who was portrayed by Linwood Boomer. The real Mary Ingalls never became a teacher nor married, but returned to De Smet to live with her parents after graduating from Vinton.

References

Further reading

External links

"Mary Ingalls Era 1877-1889." Vinton School for the Blind.

About the Ingalls Family (Sarah S. Uthoff)

1865 births
1928 deaths
American people of English descent
American blind people
Cowgirl Hall of Fame inductees
Delano family
Deaths from pneumonia in South Dakota
Ingalls family
People from De Smet, South Dakota
People from Pepin, Wisconsin
People from Vinton, Iowa